Fox Lake is an unincorporated community in Martin County, in the U.S. state of Minnesota.

History
Fox Lake was platted in 1899. It took its name from nearby Fox Lake.

References

Unincorporated communities in Martin County, Minnesota
Unincorporated communities in Minnesota